Khodor Fakih is a Lebanon-born Bulgarian surgeon of Arab descent. He is a professor at the Dental Faculty of the Medical College. He is a specialist in maxillo-facial surgery and treating jaws broken as a result of accidents and beatings. He is a chairman of the Coordination council of the Arab communities in Bulgaria and a member of the Governing Board of the Bulgarian-Lebanese Association.  As of April 2009, he had been in Bulgaria for 21 years and had been a Bulgarian citizen for 9 years. He is married to a Bulgarian woman. He participated in the Bulgarian version of the American reality TV show, Extreme Makeover. Fakih also leads the television show 1001 Candles on the Bulgarian TV channel 7 days. This TV program is for the Arab roots of what makes a community in the wider society in which they fit well but are not fully identified.

References

Living people
Bulgarian people of Lebanese descent
Bulgarian maxillofacial surgeons
Year of birth missing (living people)